Brand engagement is the process of forming an emotional or rational attachment between a consumer and a brand.  It comprises one aspect of brand management. Brand engagement will impact brand attachment and has a positive influence on customer purchase intentions. Brands can form these attachments through different strategies that will promote their brand and overall customer satisfaction.

External

Brand engagement between a brand and its consumers/potential consumers is a key objective of a brand marketing effort.

In general, the ways a brand connects to its consumer is via a range of "touchpoints"—that is, a sequence or list of potential ways the brand makes contact with the individual.  Examples include retail environments, advertising, word of mouth, online, and the product itself. The Marketing function is usually best positioned to orchestrate the organization-wide customer engagement strategy and they must be empowered to address touch points outside of their control. Implementing this change requires a mind-set shift. 

Brands do this to help influence consumers perceptions of their brand and to increase knowledge of the brand to consumers. An example of brand engagement can be seen through the Harley-Davidson Motorcycle Company with The Harley-Davidson Owners Group. Harley-Davidson directly engages their brand with their consumers by offering them the opportunity to join this group and be involved in different events and meetings for other Harley-Davidson owners. There are several different HOG chapters and each of their own hold these different events that has increased customer satisfaction among owners.

Internal ("close stakeholder")

There are two broad areas where brand engagement is relevant within an organization (employees and close stakeholders such as franchise staff, call centers, suppliers or intermediaries).

The first area is ensuring that the employer brand promised to employees is delivered upon once employees join the firm. If the employee experience is not what is promised, this could result in increased employee turnover and/or decreased performance.

The second area is ensuring employees and close stakeholders of an organization completely understand the organization's brand, and what it stands for—and to make sure that their activities on a day-to-day basis are contributing to expressing that brand through the customer experience.

In general, this requires an ongoing effort on the part of the organization to ensure that its employees and close stakeholders understand what the brand is promising to its customers, and to help all employees clearly understand how their actions and behaviors, on a day-to-day basis, either support or undermine the effort.

This often raises the issue of the value of investment in "brand engagement". It is a discretionary expense on the part of the organization. Proponents of brand engagement would argue that this is an investment—that is, the benefits to the organization outweigh the cost of the program.

Within any organization, there is competition for resources, so there is a significant need to demonstrate return on investment in employee engagement/internal communications. While it is generally accepted that it is important for internal communications professionals to demonstrate the value this function delivers to the organization, it is difficult to place a discrete figure on this contribution.

Best practice in internal communications generally adheres to certain principles:

 Understanding the stakeholder (audiences)
 Knowing what messages and information is appropriate for each audience
 Ensuring that there is a feedback mechanism in place, so communication is a dialogue
 Measuring effectiveness
 Enhancing participation and collaboration.

An aspect of internal brand engagement is brand orientation which refers to "the degree to which the organization values brands and its practices are oriented towards building brand capabilities."

Thought leaders are increasingly placing employee engagement at the forefront of the fight for greater authenticity in the workplace, increased employee satisfaction and ultimately greater retention and improved customer service. They are passionate about the link to bottom line benefits and strongly advocate working on brands from the inside out.  There are a range of experts and service providers who have created offers to bring the brand to life—all agree that the employee side of the equation is far more important than has been historically acknowledged.

The measurement angle

Much internal communication and employee engagement practice is based on measurement of effectiveness or business contribution.  The key elements in creating a model of employee engagement is the measurement of "engagement drivers"—that is, what are the factors or combinations of factors which affect productivity and commitment and can be monitored and addressed through people, process or technology changes?

Many of the “engagement drivers” currently in use internally are HR focused, and in many cases do not delve deeply into the employee’s role in delivering the brand/customer experience as a distinct element.

Example

Probably the most compelling example of this is the service-profit chain. The first real case study of this appeared in "The Service Profit Chain" (the so-called Sears Model, Harvard Business Review, 1997). This statistical model tracks increases in employee “engagement drivers” to correlated increases in customer satisfaction and loyalty, and then correlates this to increases in total shareholder return (TSR), revenue and other financial performance measures.

Since the service-profit chain emerged, it’s been developed, and criticized, but the consensus is that employee engagement can contribute roughly 20% to an organization’s TSR (various Vivaldi, Watson Wyatt, Towers Perrin studies 2004, 2005, 2006).

Collaboration and connectivity vs. content management

While some organizations are realizing the benefits of collaboration and work flow online, there appears to be significant focus on publishing and managing content, generally via content management systems.

There is an emerging school of thought that organizational perspectives on technology are frequently misaligned with the actual requirements and desires of the users of the technology. That is, the nature (or intention) of a technology may not always determine the nature of its use – the telephone, for example, was originally intended as a broadcast medium. Its designers were focused on delivering content, while its users sought – and still value – connectivity(1).

The social media phenomenon presents emerging evidence that this quest for connectivity is rapidly becoming a core focus of communication technology within organizations. This potentially creates a disconnect with more traditional content-driven models of internal communication—delivering (or making easily available) the right content at the right time to the right people using the right media.

Therefore, there could be a great deal of potential within organisations, using their existing technologies, to derive cultural and performance benefits from re-thinking how they communicate, make decisions and work virtually.

Social Media has played a major part in how people communicate and consume content across the world. Brands can use these social media platforms as ways to directly engage with their consumers. These platforms allow for these brands to be innovative and creative in the promotion of their brand by using the many different creative functions that social media has.

See also
Loyalty business model
Brand Intimacy

Sources

 Understanding the psychology of online behaviour: From content to community, a presentation by Dr. Adam Joinson Institute of Educational Technology, The Open University, 2002.
 Self-disclosure in computer-mediated communication: The role of self-awareness and visual anonymity Adam N. Joinson Institute of Educational Technology, The Open University
 In the European Union, Employee Consultation is a legal requirement.
 See Owen, Harrison. Open Space Technology: A User’s Guide. Berrett-Koelher Publishers, San Francisco, 1997 and Bunker, Barbara and Alban, Billie, Large Group Interventions, John Wiley & Sons, San Francisco, 1997.
 M Lynne Markus, Brook Manville and Carole E Agrees What makes a virtual organization work? Sloan Management Review, Cambridge, Fall 2000
 Surowiecki, James. The Wisdom of Crowds. Little, Brown; London: 2004.
 An Initial Examination of Observed Verbal Immediacy and Participants’ Opinions of Communication Effectiveness in Online Group Interaction, Paul L. Witt Texas Christian University.
 Joinson, A.N. (in press) Internet Behaviour and the design of virtual methods. In C. Hine (Ed.). Virtual Methods: issues in social research on the Internet. Oxford: Berg.
 Kiesler, S., Siegal, J. and McGuire, T. W. (1984). Social psychological aspects of computer mediated communication. American Psychologist, 39, 1123-1134.
 Dessart L., Veloutsou C. & Morgan-Thomas A., 2016, “Capturing consumer engagement: duality, dimensionality and measurement”, Journal of Marketing Management, Vol. 32, No. 5/6, pp. 399–426.
 Dessart L., Veloutsou C. & Morgan-Thomas A., 2015, “Consumer engagement in online brand communities: a social media perspective”, Journal of Product and Brand Management, Vol. 24, No. 1, pp. 28–42.
 Schau, H. J., Muñiz, A. M., & Arnould, E. J. (2009). How Brand Community Practices Create Value. Journal of Marketing, 73(5), 30–51. http://www.jstor.org/stable/20619045
 Aral, Sinan; Dellarocas, Chrysanthos; Godes, David (2013). "Introduction to the Special Issue: Social Media and Business Transformation: A Framework for Research". Information Systems Research. 24 (1): 3–13. ISSN 1047-7047.

References
2. Aral, Sinan; Dellarocas, Chrysanthos; Godes, David (2013). "Introduction to the Special Issue: Social Media and Business Transformation: A Framework for Research". Information Systems Research. 24 (1): 3–13. ISSN 1047-7047.

Engagement